According to legend, Rufinus of Assisi (Italian Rufino), was the first bishop of this city and a martyr. 

Sources concerning the life of Saint Rufino are a sermon of eleventh century Peter Damian, (Miracula Sancti Rufini Martyris), and a Passio Sancti Rufini of the 14th century.
The Acts of the martyrdom of this Rufinus are purely legendary. He is probably identical with the "episcopus Marsorum" (bishop of the Marsi) noted in the Roman Martyrology under 11 August.

Legend
Rufinus was responsible for converting Assisi to Christianity, but at what date is disputed. He and his son came from Anatolia to preach the Gospel. At some point, the Roman proconsul, Aspasius, had him arrested,  tortured, and drowned in the Chiascio River near Costano. His body was recovered and buried near where he was found. A church was built on that spot from whence, according to Petrus Damiani, his relics were translated to Assisi in the 8th century. 

His remains were put to rest in a Roman sarcophagus. The front is sculpted in low relief with the myth of Selene and Endymion. It is now located under the main altar of the Cathedral of San Rufino, which is the third church to have been erected over his remains.

Rufinus is the patron saint of Assisi. Each year, the "Palio of St. Rufinus (Palio Di San Rufino)" is held on Thursday, Friday and Saturday of the last week of August. It's a traditional competition in the bow to win the Palio (pennant).

References

Sources
 Ekkart Sauser, Biographisch-Bibliographisches Kirchenlexikon, vol. XXI (2003) pp 1284f 

Year of birth missing
3rd-century deaths
Bishops in Umbria
3rd-century Italian bishops
People from Assisi
3rd-century Christian saints